South Australia Asset Management Corporation v York Montague Ltd and Banque Bruxelles Lambert SA v Eagle Star Insurance Co Ltd [1996] UKHL 10 is a joined English contract law case (often referred to as "SAAMCO") on causation and remoteness of damage. It arose out of the property crash in the early 1990s, whereby banks were suing valuers for overpricing houses in order to recover the lost market value. Owners themselves often had little or no money, since they had fallen victim to negative equity, so mortgage lenders would pursue a valuer instead to recover some losses. The legal principle arising from the case is often referred to as the "SAAMCO principle".

Facts
In the South Australia case, a valuer had (in breach of an implied term to exercise reasonable care and skill) negligently advised his client bank that property which it proposed to take as security for a loan was worth much more than its actual market value. The question was whether he should be liable not only for losses attributable to the deficient security but also for further losses attributable to a fall in the property market. The House decided that he should not be liable for this kind of loss.

Judgment
The House of Lords held that the valuer was not liable for the losses resulting from market fluctuations. Lord Hoffmann gave his judgment as follows.

Significance
The effect of the SAAMCO case was to exclude from liability the damages attributable to a fall in the property market notwithstanding that those losses were foreseeable in the sense of being “not unlikely” (property values go down as well as up) and had been caused by the negligent valuation in the sense that, but for the valuation, the bank would not have lent at all and there was no evidence to show that it would have lost its money in some other way. It was excluded on the ground that it was outside the scope of the liability which the parties would reasonably have considered that the valuer was undertaking.

Subsequent case law has drawn a distinction between cases merely providing information, and those providing advice. The principle in SAAMCO cannot be invoked in cases where investment advisers specifically direct an investor to make a specific investment (see Rubenstein v HSBC Bank plc  and Aneco Reinsurance Underwriting Ltd (in liquidation) v Johnson & Higgins Ltd), though it may be rather difficult to carefully demarcate where information ends and directed investment advice begins.

See also
English contract law
Transfield Shipping Inc v Mercator Shipping Inc [2008] UKHL 48

References

External links
Lindsay MacDonald and Catherine May, ''Professional Negligence: Same horse, different rider?' (20.3.2008) legalweek.com

English remedy case law
English implied terms case law
House of Lords cases
1996 in case law
1996 in British law
Mortgage industry of Australia